It's a Blue World is an album by Mel Tormé that was released by Bethlehem Records.

Reception
The Billboard review in 1955 wrote that the material was mostly standards and that Tormé "renders them in a mellow, jazz-wize manner, and sales should be good among the hipsters". AllMusic stated: "Tormé invested the songs with warmth and confidence. Recorded and released around the time he turned 30, It's a Blue World marked a turning point in Mel Tormé's recording career."

Track listing
 "I Got It Bad (and That Ain't Good)" (Duke Ellington, Paul Francis Webster) – 3:23
 "Till the Clouds Roll By" (Jerome Kern, P. G. Wodehouse) – 2:54
 "Isn't It Romantic?" (Lorenz Hart, Richard Rodgers) – 3:41
 "I Know Why (And So Do You)" (Mack Gordon, Harry Warren) – 3:50
 "All This, and Heaven Too" (Eddie DeLange, Jimmy Van Heusen) – 3:39
 "How Long Has This Been Going On?" (George Gershwin, Ira Gershwin) – 3:33
 "Polka Dots and Moonbeams" (Johnny Burke, Van Heusen) – 3:56
 "You Leave Me Breathless" (Ralph Freed, Frederick Hollander) – 3:23
 "I Found a Million Dollar Baby (in a Five and Ten Cent Store)" (Mort Dixon, Billy Rose, Warren) – 3:43
 "Wonderful One" (Paul Whiteman, Ferde Grofé, Theodora Morse) – 3:17
 "It's a Blue World" (George Forrest, Robert C. Wright) – 3:45
 "Stay as Sweet as You Are" (Gordon, Harry Revel) – 3:21

Personnel 
Mel Tormé - vocals
Marty Paich - arranger, conductor
Al Pellegrini - arranger, conductor
André Previn - arranger, conductor
Russell Garcia - arranger, conductor

References

1955 albums
Mel Tormé albums
Albums arranged by Marty Paich
Albums arranged by André Previn
Albums arranged by Russell Garcia (composer)
Bethlehem Records albums
Albums conducted by Marty Paich